Mount Kipipiri is an isolated volcano in the Wanjohi Valley, on the Kinangop Plateau near to the Aberdare Range.
Wildlife includes Colobus and Sykes monkeys, elephants and buffalo and abundant birdlife.
The name of the mountain means "butterfly" in the Gikuyu language, a reference to its profile from a distance.

The Mount Kipipiri Forest Reserve is part of the Aberdare National Park.
In 2005 it was estimated that the  forest reserve was home to about 13 elephants.
In June 2009 lengthy negotiations were concluded over the alignment of a wildlife corridor between Kipipiri and the main Aberdare park, with plans to fence the corridor.
Grids of rolling bars with gaps between them replace the fence at the points where roads cross the corridor, forming an obstacle that cars can cross but that wildlife will not attempt. This keeps the wildlife, particularly elephants, away from farmers' fields.

References

Sources

 

Kipipiri
Kipipiri